Flammulaster is an genus of agaricoid fungi in the family Tubariaceae. It was formerly thought to belong in the family Inocybaceae. The genus has a widespread distribution, and contains 20 species. Flammulaster was circumscribed by American mycologist Franklin Sumner Earle in 1909.

Species

References

External links

Tubariaceae
Agaricales genera